Wilbur Cherrier Whitehead (1866-1931) was an American auction bridge and contract bridge player and writer.

Whitehead was president of the Simplex Automobile Company but retired in 1910 to devote himself to bridge. He invented several conventions of bidding and play and was instrumental in standardizing procedures in auction bridge and later in contract bridge.

Whitehead was one of the members of the Bridge Headquarters, a group of experts who developed a bidding system named the Official System. Sidney Lenz (another Bridge Headquarters member) deployed this system against Ely Culbertson in the so-called "Bridge Battle of the Century" of 1931. (Whitehead had helped Culbertson during Culberton's early days of poverty).

Whitehead was a member of the team that won the Vanderbilt Cup in its first year (1928) and finished second the following year. He was a contributing editor of Bridge World. He wrote a daily bridge column, "Sound Auction Bridge", which appeared in the New York Evening Journal.

In 1930 he donated the Whitehead Trophy, which is still given to the winner of the Whitehead Women's Pairs, an annual tournament.

Publications
 Author
.

.

Co-author

Editor

Forward

References

Notes

Bibliography

1866 births
1931 deaths
Contract bridge writers
American contract bridge players